Dublin Historic District is a national historic district located at Dublin, Pulaski County, Virginia. It encompasses 97 contributing buildings in the town of Dublin.  It includes a variety of residential, commercial, and institutional buildings dated as early as the mid-19th century.  Notable buildings include the Sutton House, Norfolk and Western Railroad Depot (1913), Bower Funeral Service, Baskerville-St.Clair House, Darst Building (1871), Bank of Pulaski County, McCorkle House (1878), Dublin Presbyterian Church, Dublin Methodist Church (1875), Grace Baptist Church, and the Municipal Building.

It was added to the National Register of Historic Places in 1992.

References

Historic districts in Pulaski County, Virginia
Victorian architecture in Virginia
National Register of Historic Places in Pulaski County, Virginia
Historic districts on the National Register of Historic Places in Virginia